Then and Now is a compilation album by American rock group Lynyrd Skynyrd. The album features songs from the original lineup and newer hits from the post crash lineup.

Track listing 
"Saturday Night Special" (Live) (Ed King, Ronnie Van Zant) – 5:44
"Workin'" (Gary Rossington, Johnny Van Zant, Rickey Medlocke, Hughie Thomasson) – 4:54
"Preacher Man" (Rossington, Van Zant, Medlocke, Thomasson) – 4:34
"Tomorrow's Goodbye" (Rossington, Van Zant, Medlocke, Thomasson, Gary Burr) – 5:07
"That Smell" (Live) (Allen Collins, Van Zant) – 6:17
"Gone Fishin'" (Rossington, Van Zant, Medlocke, Thomasson) – 4:22
"Simple Man" (Live) (Rossington, Van Zant) – 7:46
"Voodoo Lake" (Van Zant, Chris Eddy, Bob Britt) – 4:37
"Sweet Home Alabama" (Live) (King, Rossington, Van Zant) – 7:12
"Free Bird" (Live) (Collins, Van Zant) – 13:32

Tracks 1, 5, 7, and 9-10 from Lyve from Steel Town (1998)
Tracks 2-4 and 6 from Edge of Forever (1999)
Track 8 from Twenty (1997)
Live songs recorded 7/15/1997 at the Coca-Cola Star Lake Amphitheatre in Burgettstown, Pennsylvania

Then and Now: Volume Two

Then and Now: Volume Two a follow-up album was released in 2005, this again featured old and new tracks including tracks from 2003's Vicious Cycle album.

Track listing
"What's Your Name" (Live) (Rossington, Van Zant) – 3:38
"Gimme Three Steps" (Live) (Allen Collins, Ronnie Van Zant) – 4:56
"Red White & Blue" (Johnny Van Zant, Donnie Van Zant, Brad Warren, Brett Warren) – 5:31
"I Know a Little" (Live) (Steve Gaines) – 5:58
"That's How I Like It" (Gary Rossington, Johnny Van Zant, Rickey Medlocke, Hughie Thomasson, Eric Blair) – 4:33
"The Way" (Gary Rossington, Johnny Van Zant, Rickey Medlocke, Hughie Thomasson) – 5:32
"Tuesday's Gone" (Live) (Allen Collins, Ronnie Van Zant) – 7:02
"Call Me the Breeze" (Live) (J.J. Cale) – 6:17
"Lucky Man" (Gary Rossington, Johnny Van Zant, Rickey Medlocke, Hughie Thomasson) – 5:35
"The Ballad of Curtis Loew" (Live) (Allen Collins, Ronnie Van Zant) – 4:21
"We Ain't Much Different" (Gary Rossington, Johnny Van Zant, Rickey Medlocke, Hughie Thomasson, Mike Estes) – 3:44

Studio tracks (except track 11) from Vicious Cycle (2003)
Track 11 from Twenty
Live tracks from Lynyrd Skynyrd Lyve: The Vicious Cycle Tour (2004) and recorded 7/11/2003 at the AmSouth Amphitheatre in Antioch, Tennessee

External links
 Then and Now on Amazon
 Then and Now: Volume Two on Amazon

2000 greatest hits albums
2005 greatest hits albums
Lynyrd Skynyrd compilation albums